Commercial Street may refer to:
 Commercial Street, Bangalore, India
 Commercial Street, Leeds, England
 Commercial Street, London, England
 Commercial Street, Newport, Wales
 Commercial Street, Portland, Maine, USA
 Commercial Street, San Francisco, USA

See also 
 Commercial Drive, Vancouver